Hatun P'ukru (Quechua hatun big, p'ukru hole, pit, gap in a surface, "big hole", Hispanicized spelling Jatun Pucro) is a mountain in the Andes of southern Peru, about  high. It is situated in the Moquegua Region, General Sánchez Cerro Province, on the border of the districts of Chojata and Matalaque.

References

Mountains of Moquegua Region
Mountains of Peru